Wadid Jesús Arismendi (born March 25, 1987, in Arequipa, Peru) is a Peruvian footballer who currently plays for Carlos A. Mannucci.

Career statistics

References

External links
 

1987 births
Living people
Peruvian footballers
FBC Melgar footballers
Club Deportivo Universidad César Vallejo footballers
Sport Boys footballers
Universidad Técnica de Cajamarca footballers
Real Garcilaso footballers
Carlos A. Mannucci players
Peruvian Primera División players
Association football defenders